Mamadi Baldé (born 15 August 1978 in Bissau) is a Guinea-Bissauan footballer who plays for Portuguese club Moura Atlético Clube as a central defender.

References

1978 births
Living people
Sportspeople from Bissau
Bissau-Guinean footballers
Association football defenders
Sporting Clube de Bissau players
Liga Portugal 2 players
Segunda Divisão players
C.D. Fátima players
C.D. Feirense players
C.D. Pinhalnovense players
Sport Benfica e Castelo Branco players
S.C. Praiense players
Guinea-Bissau international footballers
Bissau-Guinean expatriate footballers
Expatriate footballers in Portugal
Bissau-Guinean expatriate sportspeople in Portugal